Myriopholis macrorhyncha, also known as the long-nosed worm snake or hook-snouted worm snake is a harmless blind snake species found in northern Africa and southwestern Asia. No subspecies are currently recognized.

Description
This reptile's appearance is similar to M. cairi.

Geographic range
Found in isolated populations across northern Africa and in southwestern Asia. In Africa it occurs in Morocco, Mauritania, Senegal, Guinea, Ghana, Algeria, Tunisia, Niger, Libya, Chad, Mali, Egypt, Sudan, Somalia and Ethiopia. In Asia it has been reported in Aden (Yemen), Turkey, Iran, Israel, Iraq and Pakistan. The type locality given is "Sennaar" (Sudan).

Taxonomy
A subspecies, M. m. bilmaensis Angel, 1936, found in Niger was recognized by Hahn (1980).

References

Further reading

 Hahn DE, Wallach V. 1998. Comments on the systematics of Old World Leptotyphlops (Serpentes: Leptotyphlopidae), with description of a new species. Hamadryad 23: 50-62
 Jan G. 1860. Iconogr. gén. Ophid., 1 (1. livr.): 1
 Trape JF. 2002. Note sur le statut et la répartition de quelques Leptotyphlopidés (Serpentes: Scolecophidia) du Sahara et des savanes d'[Afrique de l'Ouest. Bull. Soc. Herp. France 102: 49-62

External links
 

macrorhyncha
Reptiles described in 1860
Snakes of Africa
Snakes of Asia